Olha Freimut (born Olha Mykhailivna Konyk, née: Lokotko; 25 February 1982) is a Ukrainian TV presenter, journalist, writer and model.

Biography 
Olha was born on 25 February 1982 in Novyi Rozdil, Lviv Oblast. Her father is footballer, and her mother is master of swimming sport. In an early childhood, she attended matches with the participation of her father. For eight years she studied at the piano at the music school.

She received Master's degree in International Journalism at the University of Lviv and City, University of London, where she received a diploma magna cum laude. During her studies, she worked as a waitress.

Career  
She had worked as a journalist in the BBC, filming in advertising. After Orange Revolution returned from London to Kyiv, she got a job in the international department on Channel 5. Later she realised that work of international journalist does not satisfy her. For a time she worked as a journalist in the fashion-program Breakfast with 1+1.

In 2008, she featured in the daytime show on 1+1. She had learned by journalist Lyudmila Padlevska about casting on the daytime show at Novyi Kanal. Afterwards, she served as a co-presenter of Pidyom with Oleksandr Pedan and Serhiy Prytula. On 27 May 2011, Pidyom's finale was aired.

She writes articles about fashion. In the future, plans to seriously engage in fashion journalism. In 2010, she faced Ukrainian designer Oksana Karavanskaya.

From June 2011, together with Dima Kolyadenko, she led the program Shoumaniya. On 4 March 2012, the series was concluded.

At the end of August 2011, she launched the program Revizor in which Freimut checks the quality of the service sector establishments of Ukraine. This show has become one of the most successful in Novyi Kanal, in the season 2011/12. On 10 March 2012, together with Serhiy Prytula, she leads the show Who's on top?. In the summer of 2012, she led the program Kabrioleto together with Serhiy Prytula and Oleksandr Pedan in which they travelled through Ukraine.

In 2011, the magazine Focus complied rating "30 most successful broadcasters Ukraine", Olha Freimut took 26th place. She has experience in the field of dubbing: in the summer 2011, Fermut played as voice actress in the cartoon The Smurfs.

On 2 December 2011, she led group stage draw the European Football Championship 2012.

In the autumn of 2012, she has been a member of the jury show large reincarnation "ShoumaStgouon".

On 13 October 2013, together with Aram Mnatsakanov she leads to the Novyi Kanal show War of the Worlds as auditor of Chef.

On 3 September 2014, Freimut leads the program Freimut the Inspector on TV 1+1. In 2014, Freimut led the fourth season of the show The Voice of the country and reboot on TV 1+1.

In December 2014, the Special Inspector Freimut issued a special issue from the ATO zone, conducted an inspection on the basis of the German Armed Forces.

In 2015, ZARINA became the new face of the Jewelry House. On 2 September, at the Forum of Publishers in Lviv, she presented her first book, Where Eats and With whom Freimut Sleeps, and already on 11 October, the trainer at the show "Little Giants" on "1+1".

On 5 April 2016, on the channel 1+1 the premiere of the reality show "On knives" de Freimut was the lead. She voted the role of Pauline in the Polish TV series Our Lady in Warsaw for 1+1. In the same year, she starred in the episodic role of the Russian-Ukrainian series Hotel Elephant. Olga's voice was duplicated by another actress.

According to the magazine New Time, Fermut entered the TOP-100 of successful women of Ukraine.

On 21 February 2018, Fermut became the director of the ladies school in the reality show From Ladette to Lady. On 6 March 2018 , Fermut presented the first children's book Bread Jan – a 40-page story about the bat that wanted to see the sun. In May of the same year, her third book, School of Mrs. Freimuth: Etiquette, was published for ladies and panic people with a sense of humor and self-irony.

In the summer, Olha took part in the filming of the talk show Olia in Novyi Kanal. The show became the first legal adaptation of the famous American format The Ellen DeGeneres Show or shortly "Ellen" in the world.

Filmography

Film

Television

Trivia 
 A fan of English football club "Fulham" as the godfather of her daughter Zlata – one of the directors of the club.
 Participated in a number of videos on the theme of "Odna Krayina – Yedyna Krayina" in support of the territorial integrity of Ukraine.

References

External links 
 
 Official Website Olga Freimut

1982 births
Living people
People from Novyi Rozdil
Ukrainian journalists
Ukrainian female models
Ukrainian television presenters
University of Lviv alumni
Alumni of City, University of London
Ukrainian women television presenters